Josia fustula is a moth of the  family Notodontidae. It is found on the Pacific slope of the Andes in Ecuador and perhaps also Colombia and Peru.

Larvae have been reared on Passiflora rubra.

External links
Species page at Tree of Life project

Notodontidae of South America
Moths described in 1901